Tuclazepam is a drug which is a benzodiazepine derivative.

See also
Benzodiazepine

References

Primary alcohols
Benzodiazepines
Chlorobenzenes
GABAA receptor positive allosteric modulators